The .277 Wolverine (6.8x39mm) is a wildcat cartridge. It is a multi-purpose mid-power cartridge with increased ballistic performance over the AR-15's traditional .223 Remington (5.56×45mm NATO) cartridge requiring only a new barrel to upgrade/convert any 5.56-based firearm to .277 Wolverine.

Design

For fundamentally the same reasons that a .277 inch (7.04 mm) diameter bullet was selected for the 6.8mm Remington SPC (i.e., ideal mass-to-diameter-to-length for mid-weight bullets constrained to loading in an AR-15/M16 STANAG magazine), 6.8 mm became the caliber for a new AR-15 wildcat. Like the .300 AAC Blackout and unlike the 6.8 SPC and other "larger bore" AR-15 cartridges, the .277 Wolverine is based on the widely available 5.56×45mm parent case. Therefore, rifle components such as the bolt and magazine are interchangeable between 5.56×45mm and .277 Wolverine firearms, and standard AR-15 magazines can be used with no loss of capacity. A new barrel is the minimum required component to convert a standard AR-15 to .277 Wolverine.

In order to load heavier (therefore longer) bullets to magazine length without the problems of seating the bullet's ogive into the case mouth, the Wolverine case is shortened to approximately 39 mm from its 45 mm parent brass. The case is resized and formed in a single-step operation to create new 23-degree shoulder and larger neck.

Initial design focused on optimal performance with supersonic bullets in the 85-115 gr (5.5-7.5 g) class, therefore a 1:11 twist rate barrel with 5R rifling was selected.  Subsequent consumer interest in firing "heavy-for-caliber" subsonic bullets led to the design, testing, and production of 1:7 twist barrels to stabilize the longer heavier bullets.

Development
Initially developed, tested, and marketed as a proprietary cartridge, MDWS publicly released the detailed chamber and headspace gage specifications/drawings for the .277 Wolverine in June 2015.

At least four commercial manufacturers have produced .277 Wolverine barrels, mostly for AR-15 conversions – although MDWS also sells barrels for Savage and Remington bolt-action rifles.  Barrel manufacturers include: X-Caliber, McGowen, AR Precision, and PAC-NOR.  By the end of April 2016, more than 1,000 .277 Wolverine barrels had been sold, with more than 2,000 by mid-November 2017.  Barrels lengths include: 8.2, 10.5, 12.5, and 14.5 inch pistol; 16, 18, and 20 inch rifle.

.277 Wolverine cases are easily made by the hobbyist reloader from plentiful and inexpensive 5.56×45mm brass (shortened and resized). Extensive reloading data (including chronographed velocity, accuracy, and ballistic gel testing) is available.  Ready-to-load brass and/or loaded ammunition is available commercially from several sources including: JB's Firearms, LLC and OutdoorShooterSupply.  Reloading dies and tools are available from Hornady, Lee Precision, Sheridan Engineering, CH4D, and Little Crow Gun Works. The fire-formed .277 Wolverine case holds approximately 27.5-27.8 gr of water, compared to 28.5-28.8 gr for the parent case.

In October 2017, Starline produced 50,000 newly manufactured cases head-stamped ".277 WLV" for MDWS; all were sold in under 72 hours of posting. Starline lists the .277 Wolverine on their website as a standard offering.

Performance

The .277 Wolverine has shown near-comparable performance to the 6.8 SPC with 110 gr (7.13 g) bullets, achieving similar muzzle velocities of 2,500 fps (762 m/s) vs. 2,700 fps (823 m/s). The smaller case of the .277 Wolverine (compared to the 6.8 SPC) is more efficient and has less recoil due to its smaller propellant load.

With lighter bullets in the 80-90 gr range (5.2-5.8 g), the velocities were slightly slower than typical 5.56×45mm rounds, but the .277 Wolverine provided substantially increased energy due to greater bullet mass. For example, 60-62 gr bullets (3.9-4.0 g)  from a 5.56×45mm round typically provide less than 1,200 ft·lbs (1,627 J) of energy, while 85-90 gr bullets (5.5-5.8 g) from a .277 Wolverine round provide over 1,500 ft·lbs (2,034 J) of energy (both measured at the muzzle of a 16-inch barrel).

There are always trade-offs between cartridge size, bullet diameter and weight, muzzle velocity, and energy on-target (at any given range). The .277 Wolverine will never replace larger high-power cartridges such as the .308 Winchester (7.62×51mm NATO) or .270 Winchester for long range shooting; however – it outperforms the .223 Remington at typical hunting ranges and approaches the 6.8 SPC while using less expensive components (brass, magazines, bolt, less powder per load).

The following table provides comparative performance data for several factory cartridges in the mid-power AR-15 class:

Applications
The .277 Wolverine provides similar ballistic performance to the 6.8 SPC for accuracy, hunting (varmints to medium-game), target shooting, and home/personal defense. 277/6.8mm bullets are widely available from all major reloading component manufacturers (e.g., Speer, Sierra, Hornady, Nosler, Barnes, Remington, Winchester, Woodleigh, Lehigh Defense, Hawk, etc.) in a wide range of bullet weights from 85 to 200 grains (5.5-13 g) and styles useful in the .277 Wolverine - including lead-free practice, competition target, varmint, defensive, and game hunting.

The complete bolt carrier group (carrier, bolt, firing pin, and cam pin) and charging handle can be swapped between the original 5.56×45 and the .277 Wolverine upper.

Comparisons
The AR-15 family of rifles has been chambered in a wide range of cartridges, from the diminutive .17 rimfire up to the massive .50 Beowulf. The 277 WLV provides medium bore (.277") performance that exceeds the parent 5.56×45 cartridge and also the .300 BLK, while approaching the power of the larger military 6.8 SPC which requires larger cases and dedicated components (e.g., bolt and magazines). Per an interview with the cartridge's designer: "I liked the performance of the 6.8 SPC and the versatility of the 300 Blackout. After researching both of them extensively, and having a lot of conversations with many, many experienced professionals and enthusiasts, I decided to move forward with a new cartridge design that would hopefully combine the attributes of both, and dismiss the deficiencies."

The cartridge that the 277 Wolverine is most often compared to is the 300 AAC Blackout, with each having its strengths and limitations. Although the 300 BLK has recently grown in popularity with civilians, it was initially created as a SAAMI-approved subsonic cartridge for the US military. When special operations command soldiers (SOCOM) are in an urban environment, the operations known as "clearing a building" involve bringing a weapon into confined spaces where long range and high-velocity are not required. Penetration through a door (and other obstacles) with reduced bullet fragmentation would be enhanced by using a much heavier bullet, compared to the standard NATO combat 5.56 x 45 cartridge at 55gr-63gr.

Since high velocity were not needed, the rifle in this application could have a much shorter barrel, which improves maneuverability inside a building. Since the US military does not use hollow-point ammunition in combat, a heavy full metal jacket bullet (FMJ) was needed. Existing military 7.62 mm bullets (.308 inches) were experimented with, and were found to be satisfactory. When using the small case of the existing 5.56 x 45 military cartridge, and then modified to .308 caliber, the gunpowder charge of the 300 BLK case has a modest capacity. This limited the cartridge to fairly slow speeds when using the heaviest bullets.

Firing an M4 carbine in a confined indoor space is very loud. Soldiers in combat rarely use hearing protection, so they are able to hear spontaneous commands during an operation, leading to widespread hearing damage. The cartridge that would become the 300 BLK already had a slow speed with its designated heavy bullets. SOCOM added a noise suppressor, and by lowering the bullet speeds further to below 1,000 feet per second (sub-sonic), a significant lowering of the noise level was achieved, while still meeting the minimum performance requirements.

Civilian enthusiasts of the 300 BLK have stated that the quiet nature of the cartridge (when suppressed), coupled with the mild recoil of the modest powder charge have made this a pleasant cartridge to shoot for sport, and also home defense. The ability to use abundant and affordable 5.56 x 45 cases to form 300 BLK cases for re-loading is also frequently mentioned as highly beneficial.

With the success of the 300 BLK, hand-loaders wondered which other bullet options could be adapted to fill the opportunities between the two existing extremes, using an AR-15 pattern rifle. The AR-15 standard cartridge is a .223 caliber, frequently using bullets in the 55 to 77 gr weight range. The 300 BLK can be found in factory-loaded ammunition from 100 to 220 gr. Although, the solid .308 bullets that are lighter than 150 gr do not have optimum ballistic coefficients (hollow-point bullets can have an optimum profile at a slightly lower weight than 150 gr).

Any cartridge candidates for the AR-15 family of rifles must be limited to a cartridge over all length (COAL) of 2.260 inches, in order to fit in the magazines.

The .25-45 Sharps cartridge is an AR-15 wildcat that is growing in popularity. It uses .257 caliber bullets (6.5 mm), and popular bullet weights are between 75 to 117 gr. This cartridge also uses the abundant 5.56 case as its parent, for affordable re-loading. There is no benefit to loading this cartridge to subsonic velocities, so all loadings are directed at improving impact when using light-weight high-velocity bullets. The 5.56 case neck is re-sized to 6.5 mm/.257, but the shoulder is not reformed, like the 277 WLV and the 300 BLK. As a result, the .25-45 has the same powder capacity as the 5.56 x 45.

Ranchers have reported good results with the .25-45 when hunting livestock predators, such as coyotes. However, when using only high-velocity bullets with a good ballistic coefficient shape (for longer range and higher delivered energy at any given distance), there was still a performance gap between the .25-45 Sharps and the 300 Blackout bullet options.

A popular 7 mm hunting caliber bullet is actually .283 in diameter (7.2 mm), but wildcat cartridges using this caliber bullet in a 5.56 x 45 case have so far not been successful. There is an existing and well-developed use of hunting-rifle bullets in the .277 caliber (6.8 mm), introduced by Winchester as the 270 in 1925. This provides many excellent bullet-weight options that fit well between the .257 caliber, and the .308 caliber.

When designing bullets, they can be made longer and heavier without detracting from their aerodynamic efficiency. However, when shortening a bullet to create an option with a lower weight, there is a limit that should not be exceeded when a good ballistic coefficient is desired in order to maintain the best possible stability, accuracy, and retained velocity at the longer ranges.  To use an efficient and low-drag "spitzer boat-tail" shape of bullet, a minimum length for optimum performance is 4.23 times the caliber. This formula shows that a .308 bullet would not be as efficient as possible, if the ideal shape was scaled down to a solid bullet weight that is less than approximately 150 gr (a hollow-point configuration slightly alters this ratio).

Loaded ammunition in the 300 BLK caliber can be purchased as light as 100 gr, with the 125 gr class of bullets proving to be popular when shooting at higher velocities. However, to use a bullet that has a weight near 125 gr at supersonic velocities, the .277 caliber has a much more ideal shape for stability and accuracy (longer and slimmer), compared to the shorter and fatter 300 BLK at the same 125 gr weight. When a fired bullet slows to the supersonic-to-subsonic transition speed (roughly 1,100 FPS at sea level, slightly lower at higher altitudes), its can lose stability. A bullet at 125 gr in the .277 Wolverine caliber will stay supersonic at greater ranges than the 300 BLK, when comparing the same bullet weight and construction.

To use the .277 Wolverine to fire a heavy sub-sonic bullet for short range, factory-loaded ammunition can currently be found using 175 gr bullets. When comparing the .277 Wolverine to the 300 BLK, the 300 BLK has more options for the heavier sub-sonic bullets (168-220 gr), but when shooting the lighter super-sonic bullets (90-130 gr), the .277 Wolverine has a greater variety of better options, with each having an excellent ballistic coefficient (for hand-loading, .277 bullets are available as heavy as 200 gr).

Although the .277 WLV and the 300 BLK can both fire a selection of heavy or light bullets, the barrel rifling twist-ratio is fixed, and is chosen to optimize the expected task that will be given to it. For both of these calibers, longer-range shooting with light bullets at super-sonic velocities can benefit from a longer barrel and a relatively slow twist, such as 1:11 (one rotation in eleven inches).

Sub-sonic velocities using heavy bullets have the option of using a much shorter barrel, and are more accurate when using a relatively fast rifling twist, such as a ratio near 1:8 (one rotation in eight inches).

Because the 277 Wolverine's bullet diameter is smaller than the 300 BLK, the bullets ogive curve in its profile is located closer to its tip, which results in the 277 WLV case-shoulder being able to be formed at a 3 mm higher location than the 300 BLK. This means that although they both use the same parent case, the 277 WLV has more powder capacity, which is a benefit when trying to achieve the best possible velocity when using the lighter super-sonic bullets (24.5 gr of water in an unloaded case for the 300 BLK, 27.6 gr for the .277 WLV)

When using the AR-15 family of rifles, all three of these alternative calibers use the same bolt carrier group (BCG) and upper receiver as the standard 5.56 x 45 rifle. The 300 BLK requires the forward-most alignment ribs inside the NATO STANAG magazines to be removed, due to the larger diameter of the bullet. The alternative is to purchase 300 BLK-specific magazines.

The .25-45 Sharps and the 277 Wolverine can both use the standard M4 NATO STANAG magazines, and also any AR-15 pattern 5.56mm magazines without any modification.

See also
 .25-45 Sharps
 6.8mm Remington SPC
 7.62×40mm Wilson Tactical
 Glossary of firearms terminology
 List of AR platform cartridges
 List of rifle cartridges
 Table of handgun and rifle cartridges

References

Pistol and rifle cartridges
Wildcat cartridges